Gaginsky District is an administrative district (raion), one of the forty in Nizhny Novgorod Oblast, Russia. Municipally, it is incorporated as Gaginsky Municipal District. It is located in the southeast of the oblast. Its administrative center is the rural locality (a selo) of Gagino. Population: 12,444 (2010 Census);  The population of Gagino accounts for 31.3% of the district's total population.

History
The district was established in 1929.

References

Notes

Sources

Districts of Nizhny Novgorod Oblast
States and territories established in 1929
 
